Puértolas is a municipality located in the province of Huesca, Aragon, Spain. , the municipality has a population of 239  inhabitants.

References

Municipalities in the Province of Huesca